Acacia euthyphylla is a shrub belonging to the genus Acacia and the subgenus Phyllodineae native to Western Australia.

Description
It has a rounded to funnel-shaped habit with reasonably dense foliage. The slightly flexuose and finely ribbed branchlets are glabrous. It blooms between August and September producing yellow flowers.

Taxonomy
The species was first formally described by the botanist Bruce Maslin in 1999 as part of the work Acacia miscellany 16. The taxonomy of fifty-five species of Acacia, primarily Western Australian, in section Phyllodineae (Leguminosae: Mimosoideae) as published in the journal Nuytsia. The species was reclassified in 2003 as Racosperma euthyphyllum by Leslie Pedley and transferred back to the genus Acacia in 2006.

Distribution
It is endemic to an area along the south coast of the Goldfields-Esperance region of Western Australia where it is found along the edges of salt lakes and marshes and seasonally wet swamp areas growing in sandy-clay-loam soils. It is often part of tall myrtale shrubland and mallee woodland communities.

See also
 List of Acacia species

References

euthyphylla
Acacias of Western Australia
Plants described in 1999
Taxa named by Bruce Maslin